Cosmosoma ethodaea is a moth of the family Erebidae. It was described by Herbert Druce in 1889. It is found in Mexico.

References

ethodaea
Moths described in 1889